The 1887 All-Ireland Senior Football Championship Final was the first All-Ireland Final and the culmination of the 1887 All-Ireland Senior Football Championship, an inter-county Gaelic football tournament for the top teams in Ireland. Limerick were the winners. It was the first of two All-Ireland football titles for Limerick - the other coming in 1896.

In 2005, a gold medal won by the final's man-of-the-match Malachi O'Brien fetched €26,500 (three times its guide price) at London auction house Sotheby's. It is believed to be the oldest All-Ireland football medal in existence. The Limerick Leader purchased the medal and said it intended to display it in Limerick.

References

 Corry, Eoghan, The GAA Book of Lists (Hodder Headline Ireland, 2005).
 Donegan, Des, The Complete Handbook of Gaelic Games (DBA Publications Limited, 2005).
 

Gaelic football
All-Ireland Senior Football Championship Finals
Limerick county football team matches
Louth county football team matches